José Molina (a.k.a. José Molinas) was Mayor of Ponce, Puerto Rico in 1822.

Biography
Molina was born in Cataluña, Spain, around 1782. In 1827 he was a landowner and slave owner, and owned an hacienda. He lived in Ponce's Barrio Oeste (now [2018] known as Barrio Segundo). He married Petrona Villar, from Ponce, and had seven children: Maria Socorro (ca. 1813), Carmen (ca. 1821), Felicita (ca. 1823), Rita (ca. 1825), Margarita (ca. 1826), Jose Maria (ca. 1828), and Dolores (ca. 1829).

Molina is best remembered for heading a collection of funds to be donated by well-to-do residents in Barrio Playa for the construction of a watch tower on the east side of Barrio Playa, at Point Peñoncillo, in order to add to the security of the Port of Ponce which, at the time, was being threatened by pirates. This collection was in response to concerns from military commander Ramon Gonzalez.

References

See also

Ponce, Puerto Rico
List of Puerto Ricans

Mayors of Ponce, Puerto Rico
1780s births
1860s deaths
Year of birth uncertain
Year of death uncertain